Greece competed at the 2020 Summer Paralympics in Tokyo, Japan, from 24 August to 5 September 2021.

Medalists

Archery

Women

Athletics 

Men's track

Men's field

Women's field

Boccia 

Grigoris Polychronidis, Anastasia Pyrgiotis and Anna Ntenta have all qualified for the Games..

Individual

Pairs and Teams

Cycling

Judo 

Theodora Paschalidou has qualified for the Games.

Powerlifting

Men

Shooting

Greece entered one athletes into the Paralympic competition. Sotirios Galogavros successfully break the Paralympic qualification at the 2019 WSPS World Championships which was held in Sydney, Australia.

Swimming 

Twelve Greek swimmers are qualified to compete.
Men

Women

Table tennis 

Marios Chatzikyriakos has qualified for the Games.

Men

Wheelchair fencing

Vasilis Dounis and Panagiotis Triantafyllou have qualified for the Games.

Men

Wheelchair tennis

Greece qualified two players entries for wheelchair tennis. All of them qualified by the world rankings.

See also 
 Greece at the Paralympics
 Greece at the 2020 Summer Olympics

References 

Nations at the 2020 Summer Paralympics
2020
Summer Paralympics